Grace Ling Liang English School (informally GLLES) is a private, co-educational school imparting primary, secondary and higher secondary education, in Kolkata, West Bengal, India. The school is located at 21B, Hughes Road in the city of Kolkata and is open to children from all creeds and communities.

The school has a church. The school is equipped with a basketball court.

History
The late Rev. Dr. and Mrs. T. David Lamb, a missionary couple that came to India from Shanghai, China in 1949, founded the Ling Liang Chinese Church Trust in 1961 and the Grace Ling Liang English School in January 1974. They brought with them a keen respect for literacy and did commendable piece of pioneering work in the field of education which finally resulted in the establishment of two educational institutions, one in central Kolkata and other in Tangra, an eastern suburb of Kolkata.

Recognition
The Grace Ling Liang English School is recognized by the Department of Education, Government of West Bengal and is affiliated to the Council for the Indian School Certificate Examinations, New Delhi, which conducts the ICSE and ISC Examinations at the close of Classes X and XII respectively.

School Session
The school session is from April to March. Saturday is the normal weekly holiday (in addition to Sunday).

Principals
 Late Dr. Ravi Verma
 Mr. Y. Victor Lalmohan Roy
 Dr. M.C. Alexander
 Mr Valentine Peter Roy
 Mr Terence John
 Ms. Dorothy Matthews

 
Schools in Kolkata
1974 establishments in West Bengal
Educational institutions established in 1974